Harold John Cihlar (July 16, 1914 – August 21, 1995) was an American professional basketball player. Cihlar played in the National Basketball League for the Cleveland Chase Brassmen in 1943–44. He averaged 0.3 points per game in four career games played.

References

1914 births
1995 deaths
American men's basketball players
Basketball players from Cleveland
Case Western Spartans men's basketball players
Centers (basketball)
Cleveland Chase Brassmen players
Forwards (basketball)